The Nigerian National Assembly delegation from Gombe State comprises three Senators and seven Representatives.

9th Assembly (2019–Date)

The 9th National Assembly (2019 -Date) was inaugurated on 12 June 2019.
The All Peoples' Congress (APC) won all the Senate and House of Representatives'seats.

Senators representing Gombe State in the 9th Assembly are:

Representatives in the 9th Assembly are:

See also
Senate of Nigeria
Nigerian National Assembly

References

Gombe State
National Assembly (Nigeria) delegations by state